Örebro Central Station is a railway station in Örebro, Sweden, located north of city center. The station building was designed by architect Adolf W. Edelsvärd and was originally named Örebro Norra (Örebro North Station).

References

Railway stations in Örebro County
Buildings and structures in Örebro
1867 establishments in Sweden
Railway stations opened in 1867